Sudbury is a provincial electoral district in Ontario, Canada, that has been represented in the Legislative Assembly of Ontario since 1908. It is one of the two districts serving the city of Greater Sudbury.

Its population in 2001 was 89,443.

Sudbury was given its own riding provincially in the 1908 election, when the former riding of Nipissing West was divided into Sudbury and Sturgeon Falls. It initially included a large portion of the Sudbury District; in 1952, the boundaries were narrowed significantly to include only the city of Sudbury, the geographic township of McKim and the town of Copper Cliff. The rest of the original Sudbury riding was incorporated into the new riding of Nickel Belt. The riding of Sudbury East was additionally created in 1967.

Federally, however, the city remained part of the Nipissing electoral district until 1947.

Geography

Sudbury electoral district consists of the part of the City of Greater Sudbury bounded on the west and south by the Greater Sudbury city limits, and on the north and east by a line drawn from the western city limit of Greater Sudbury east along the northern limit of the former Town of Walden, north, east and south along the limits of the former City of Sudbury, west along Highway 69 and Regent Street, south along Long Lake Road, west along the northern boundary of the Township of Broder, southwest along Kelly Lake, and south along the eastern limit of the former Town of Walden to the southern city limit of Greater Sudbury.

Demographics

According to the Canada 2011 Census

Ethnic groups: 87.9% White, 8.4% Aboriginal 
Languages: 68.6% English, 23.7% French, 2.8% Italian 
Religions: 77.3% Christian (55.6% Catholic, 5.4% United Church, 4.3% Anglican, 1.7% Lutheran, 1.5% Baptist, 1.3% Pentecostal, 1.2% Presbyterian, 6.3% Other Christian), 20.8% No religion

History

The provincial electoral district was first contested in the 1908 election. Prior to its creation, the town of Sudbury was part of the district of Nipissing West.

In 1996, Ontario was divided into the same electoral districts as those used for federal electoral purposes. They were redistributed whenever a readjustment took place at the federal level.

In 2005, legislation was passed by the Legislature to divide Ontario into 107 electoral districts, beginning with the next provincial election in 2007. The eleven northern electoral districts are those defined for federal purposes in 1996, based on the 1991 census (except for a minor boundary adjustment). The 96 southern electoral districts are those defined for federal electoral purposes in 2003, based on the 2001 census. Without this legislation, the number of electoral districts in northern Ontario would have been reduced from eleven to ten.

Members of the Legislative Assembly/Members of Provincial Parliament

This riding has elected the following members of the Legislative Assembly of Ontario:

Election results

2007 electoral reform referendum

References

External links 
Map of riding for 2018 election

Ontario provincial electoral districts
Politics of Greater Sudbury